José Manuel Fidalgo Soares (born August 5, 1979) is a Portuguese model and actor.

Personal life 

He has a son named Lourenço (born 2009) with ex-wife Fernanda Marinho. He also has a daughter named Maria (born 2014) with Nádia Nóvoa.

Career 
Fidalgo's career begun when he was a child acting in theater and television commercials.
He made his name through television where he appears in severals since 2000 until today in famous fiction series.

He is popular in Portugal, really appreciated by the female (and male) audience also for his  good looking appearance.

In 2007, he appeared in the film Heart Tango, made for Intimissimi, directed by Gabriele Muccino and with Monica Bellucci. In 2008, he starred in Amália, a film portraying the life of Portuguese fado singer Amália Rodrigues.

Filmography

Theater 
 2006 – 1755- Grande Terramoto, directed by Jorge Fraga, in the Theater of the Trindade
 2003 – La Ronde, of Arthur Schnitzler, directed by Peter Baron, presented for the Company of In Theater Impetus in the Estefânia Club.
 2000 – Auto of the Cananeia, of Gil Vicente, directed by Maria Emília Correia, presented for the Company of Theater the Red and the Black in the Convent of D. Dinis in Odivelas.
 1998/1999 – Metropólis, of Howard Korder, directed by Peter Baron, presented for the Company of In Theater Impetus, in the  secondary school Maria Amália.

Cinema 
 2011 – Milagre, directed by Amadeu Pena da Silva, character "Cristo", Produced by Cristiana Gaspar
 2011 – Encantado por te Ver (short),Directed by João de Goes, character "Carlos", Produced by João de Goes
 2007 – Heart Tango, with Monica Bellucci, directed by Gabriele Muccino
 2007 – Marginal 5, directed by Hugo Diogo, character “Carlos”, Produced by Costa do Castelo Films
 2005 – Joseph, directed by Marc Ângelo, a production FF Films for the French television
 2004 – Anita na Praia short story directed by Anabela Teixeira.
 2003 – Fascinio, directed by Jose Fonseca and Costa, character Bernardette

Television 
 2007/08 – Fascínios, a TVI soap opera.
 2006/07 – Tempo de Viver, coordination of Andre Cerqueira, character Bruno Santana, a production NBP for TVI.
 2005 – Ines, directed by João Cayatte, character Pêro Coelho, a series produced for Antinomy for RTP
 2004/2005 – Ninguem como Tu, coordination of project of Andre Cerqueira, character Miguel, novel produced for the NBP for the TVI.
 2004 – Series Inspector Max, directed by Carlos Neves and Atílio Riccó, special participation, a production NBP for the TVI
 2004 – Maré Alta series, directed by Jorge Marecos, special participation, a production SP Films for the SIC
 2004 – Queridas Feras, novel directed by Manuel Amaro Costa, character Alexander Master, a production NBP for the TVI
 2003/2004 – Ana e os Sete, directed by António Moura Matos and Carlos Neves, special appearance, a production NBP for the TVI.
 2002/2003 – Olhar da Serpente, novel directed by Alvaro Fugulin and Nuno Vieira, character António, a production NBP for the SIC
 2000/2001 – Presentation of the program Disney club in the RTP

References

External links 
 Heart Tango - Intimissimi 
 Blog about José Fidalgo 

1979 births
Living people
Portuguese male film actors
Portuguese male television actors
Place of birth missing (living people)